Leptospermum recurvum is a species of shrub or tree that is endemic to Mount Kinabalu in Malaysian Borneo.

Description
It has thin, pale, flaky bark and young stems that have a broad flange near the leaf bases. The upper surface of the leaves is mostly glossy and the lower surface usually silky-hairy at first. There are broad reddish brown bracts at the base of the flower buds that mostly remain at the base of the open flowers. Flowering probably occurs in most months.

Taxonomy and naming
Leptospermum recurvum was first formally described in 1852 by Joseph Dalton Hooker in William Jackson Hooker's book, Icones Plantarum.

Distribution and habitat
This teatree is endemic on Mount Kinabalu where it grows at high altitudes in crevices between rocks.

References

recurvum
Flora of Sabah
Flora of Sulawesi
Taxa named by Joseph Dalton Hooker
Plants described in 1852
Flora of Mount Kinabalu
Endemic flora of Borneo